Derrymore is a rural locality in the Lockyer Valley Region, Queensland, Australia. In the  Derrymore had a population of 83 people.

History 
Puzzling Gully Provisional School opened on 24 July 1899. On 1 January 1909 it became Puzzling Gully State School. In 1914 it was renamed Derrymore State School. It closed in 1922.

In the  Derrymore had a population of 83 people.

References 

Lockyer Valley Region
Localities in Queensland